Ceroxys caerulea is a species of ulidiid or picture-winged fly in the genus Ceroxys of the family Ulidiidae.

References

Ceroxys